Fear Effect Sedna is an indie isometric video game developed by French studio Sushee and published by Forever Entertainment under license from Square Enix Collective. The game's development was funded via a Kickstarter campaign. It is the third installment in the Fear Effect series, and was released on March 6, 2018, for PlayStation 4, Nintendo Switch, Windows, and Xbox One. The game is a sequel to Fear Effect, which was released in 1999, and was co-written by the first game's writer.

Reception

Fear Effect Sedna received generally negative reviews from critics upon release.

References

External links
 

2018 video games
Indie video games
Kickstarter-funded video games
LGBT-related video games
Role-playing video games
Single-player video games
Stealth video games
Video games developed in France
Video games featuring female protagonists
Video games set in Greenland
Video games set in Hong Kong
Video games set in Paris
Video games with cel-shaded animation
Video game sequels
Nintendo Switch games
PlayStation 4 games
Windows games
Xbox One games
Forever Entertainment games